Darrell Robison (August 30, 1931 – January 14, 2002) was an American alpine skier. He competed in the men's slalom at the 1952 Winter Olympics.

References

1931 births
2002 deaths
American male alpine skiers
Olympic alpine skiers of the United States
Alpine skiers at the 1952 Winter Olympics
Sportspeople from Reno, Nevada